Darreh Zhaleh-ye Olya (also Romanized as Darreh Zhāleh-ye ‘Olyā; also known as Darreh Zhāleh-ye Bālā) is a village in Ozgoleh Rural District, Ozgoleh District, Salas-e Babajani County, Kermanshah Province, Iran. At the 2006 census, its population was 20, in 5 families.

References 

Populated places in Salas-e Babajani County